Norman R. DeBlieck (December 20, 1926 – Dececmber 24, 2021) was an American farmer and politician.

DeBlieck was born on a farm near Walnut Grove, Minnesota. He went to school in Lyon County, Minnesota and served in the Minnesota National Guard from 1950 to 1952. Deblieck was a farmer and lived in Tracy, Minnesota with his wife and family. DeBlieck served in the Minnesota House of Representatives in 1987 and 1989 and was a Democrat. He died at the Hospice of Murray County in Slayton, Minnesota.

References

1926 births
2021 deaths
People from Lyon County, Minnesota
People from Redwood County, Minnesota
Farmers from Minnesota
Minnesota National Guard personnel
Democratic Party members of the Minnesota House of Representatives